The social impact of thong underwear has been covered extensively in the media, ranging from bans on wearing thongs to thongs for children. The rise of thong usage has been asserted by Christian minister Oneil McQuick to be linked to a rise of sexualization in society, and by Christian writer Philo Thelos to be linked to a rise in the desire to go unclothed.

Overview 
When discussing the trend of wearing thongs, Christian writer Sharon Daugherty comments in her book What Guys See That Girls Don't: Or Do They? that the fashion industry "may have changed the mindset of our society", which was followed by her observation that "the whole idea of wearing so that no panty line or bumps can show isn't substantiated" and that "the thong was created by fashion designers to arouse sexual thoughts".

Monica Lewinsky gave evidence during the Lewinsky scandal that she was flirting with Bill Clinton in Leon Panetta's office, and that she lifted her jacket to show him the straps of her thong underwear above her pants. Some of the news media in America used thong underwear as a metonym for smut in the Starr Report. According to feminist commentator Carrie Lukas, Lewinsky "with her thong-snapping seduction, forever changed the image of the D.C. junior staffer from aspiring policy wonk to sexual temptress."

Marketing analysts Marian L. Salzman, Ira Matathia and Ann O'Reilly observed in the book Buzz: Harness the Power of Influence and Create Demand that thong brands are riding on the wide media coverage of thongs to create buzz. Photographer Lauren Greenfield wrote in her book Girl Culture, "Understanding the dialectic between the extreme and the mainstream – the anorexic and the dieter, the stripper and the teenager who bares her midriff or wears a thong – is essential to understanding contemporary feminine identity."

In 2004, political commentator Cedric Muhammad wrote in essay The Thong versus the Veil, "We wondered at the end of the day, of the two groups of women most prominently featured on American TV these days, who gains more respect for their intellect and spirit – the Afghan woman who is so totally veiled that you can't even see her eyes or the Black woman in the R&B and Hip-Hop video who dances while wearing a bikini and thong?"

School restrictions
In 1999 a Miami University male professor was banned from using the school's recreation center because he refused to stop wearing thong swimwear. The professor challenged the school in court. In 2000 a high school principal in Salinas, California was in the center of a variety of controversies including bans on certain types of clothing to the extent that "thong panties were unofficially banned." One student alleged that she was given a dress-code violation note for wearing a thong. This story made national headlines in the United States.

In 2002, a female high school vice principal in San Diego physically checked up to 100 female students' underwear as they entered the school for a dance, with or without student permission, causing an uproar among students and some parents and eliciting an investigation by the school into the vice principal's conduct. In her defense, the vice principal said the checks were for student safety and not specifically because of the wearing of thongs. In 2003, the head teacher of a British primary school voiced her concern after learning that female students as young as 10 were wearing thong underwear to school. This incident led to a media debate about the appropriateness of thong underwear marketed to young girls.

In 2003 the University of Victoria Law School in Canada briefly put the school logo on thongs, but quickly pulled them from sale after controversy sprang up. In the mid-2000s the dress code for St. Ambrose Academy, a Roman Catholic middle school and high school in Madison, Wisconsin, specifically described swimsuits with "thong-cut legs" as inappropriate. In the same decade Dixon High School in Dixon, California had a dress code which specified that all undergarments – specifically listing thongs, along with bras and briefs – must be covered.

Sports
In 2012 the 4-H program at the University of California specifically forbade "string, thong or crochet" swimsuits for women. For men, the dress code specified "swim trunks only (no shorts, cut-off pants, or Speedos)." A similar policy by Virginia FCCLA bans "skimpy bikini or thong type suits" for women and specifies "swim trunks" for men ("no speedos").

In 2001, Vicky Botwright, then 16th seeded in women's squash circuit and dubbed the "Lancashire Hot Bot", was prohibited by the Women's International Squash Players Association (WISPA) from wearing a thong and a sports bra in the British Open Championships. Initially, WISPA was "suggesting a thong was inappropriate", but in the end decided no formal ruling was needed against thongs. Botwright stated that "we should be able to wear skimpy clothing if we want to, as some of the more conventional outfits we wear can be quite restrictive..."

In 2004, Alexander Putnam competed in the London Marathon in a green thong and painted as a tropical tree to protest against logging in Congo.

Female bodybuilders in America are prohibited from wearing thong or T-back swimsuits if contests are being filmed for television, otherwise they are allowed to do so.

For younger girls
The 2000s saw a rise in the popularity of thongs among younger girls, who have been dubbed "thong feminists" by comedian Janeane Garofalo.  According to child therapist Ron Taffel, when 12-year-old girls wear a thong, "it's not about rebellion against adults"; rather, he says that the thong is a "statement to other kids that they are part of this very, very intense, powerful second family of peer group and pop culture that is shaping kids' wants, needs and feelings." Developmental psychologist Deborah Tolman does not agree that all young girl thong-wearing is sexualized; she states that "[k]ids are engaged with their sexuality at younger ages, but they're not necessarily sexually active", and she says tween thong wearers may be facing "...social pressure to look sexy — without crossing over the murky line into seeming slutty".

The trend has been attributed to pop idols like Britney Spears and Jennifer Lopez. In 2002 Abercrombie & Fitch released a line of thong underwear targeted for girls ages 10–16, though critics pointed out that children as young as seven could fit one of the thongs. A spokesman for A&F, Hampton Carney, stated that he could list "at least 100 reasons why a young girl would want thong underwear." This controversy spawned a great deal of free publicity for Abercrombie, including a chain letter that received wide circulation. In 2007 British retailer Argos removed from sale its G-string panties and padded bras for nine-year-old girls, following negative response from the public. In Japan, photobooks and DVDs of underaged girls in T-back thongs have become popular as "T-back Junior Idols", a phenomenon which has been criticised as a disguised form of child pornography.

Other incidents
 In October 2002, Florida officials banned thongs from Daytona Beach.
 In 2007 the Tennessee Department of Correction banned prison visitors from wearing thong or g-string underwear. In the words of Correction Commissioner George Little, prisoners "don't need any help getting turned on."
 During photography for Google Street View, a woman in a thong was one of the images discovered that caused consternation over the project.
 In 2019, an online retailer's high-cut 'front thong' bodysuit garnered a negative response from women, who felt the garment was too revealing and that it could cause discomfort to the genital area.

Popular culture
 In 1999, R&B singer Sisqó recorded the "Thong Song" on his Unleash the Dragon album.
 Writer-director Glen Weiss made three movies titled the Thong Girl, based on the comic book of the same name. The story of the films revolved around the Thong Girl, an independent superhero. Parts of the film were shot in Nashville's mayor's office in 2007.
 Beermaker Rolling Rock aired a commercial poking fun of male thong wearers during Super Bowl XLI.
 In 2002, Shefali Zariwala, a model in India, became known as the "thong girl" for her performance in which her thong is visible, in the music video of Kaanta Laga. The album sold two million copies and the music video became an overnight success in India.
 In 2008, a diamond studded thong worth US$122,000 was featured in a Singapore lingerie fashion show. It had 518 brilliant-cut diamonds, totaling , studded into the front of a black lace thong in a floral pattern, as well as 27 white gold tassels hanging off it.
 In 2015, American rapper Cupcakke released the song "Vagina", which includes the lyric, I change the thongs two times a day. The song, along with other songs by Cupcakke, went viral on TikTok, and the lyric is one of many Cupcakke lyrics that has been interpolated into popular songs, as part of a long running trend on the app.

See also

Sexual objectification
Sexual revolution
Underwear as outerwear
Whale tail

References 

Lingerie
Undergarments
Sportswear
Swimsuits
Sexuality and society